Zakouma Airport  is an airport located in the Salamat region in Chad. It serves the Zakouma National Park.

Facilities 

References 

Airports in Chad
Salamat Region